Biconvex optimization is a generalization of convex optimization where the objective function and the constraint set can be biconvex. There are methods that can find the global optimum of these problems. 

A common practice for solving a biconvex problem (which does not guarantee global optimality of the solution) is alternatively updating  by fixing one of them and solving the corresponding convex optimization problem.

The generalization to functions of more than two arguments
is called a block multi-convex function.
A function

is block multi-convex
iff it is convex with respect to each of the individual arguments
while holding all others fixed.

References 

Convex optimization
Generalized convexity